Americus Vespucius Rice (November 18, 1835 – April 4, 1904) was a nineteenth-century politician, banker, and businessman from Ohio. He served in the Union Army during the American Civil War and was appointed brigadier general at the end of the war, on May 31, 1865. From 1875 to 1879, he served two consecutive terms in the United States House of Representatives.

Early life
Rice was born in Perrysville, Ohio, on November 18, 1835, to Clark Hammond Rice and Catherine (Mowers) Rice. He pursued in classical studies, attended Antioch College, graduated from Union College and studied law.

Civil War

At the outbreak of the Civil War, Rice was commissioned as a captain in the 21st Ohio Volunteer Infantry Regiment on April 27, 1861, and served until his regiment was mustered out of service on August 12 of the same year.

Rice was commissioned as a captain in the 57th Ohio Infantry on September 2, 1861.  He was promoted to lieutenant colonel on February 8, 1862, and became the regiment's colonel on May 24, 1863.

As colonel of the 57th Ohio Infantry at the Battle of Kennesaw Mountain in the Atlanta Campaign, he was wounded and his right leg was amputated.

On January 13, 1866, President Andrew Johnson nominated Rice for appointment as a brigadier general of volunteers to rank from a May 31, 1865, appointment date. Rice was mustered out of service on January 15, 1866. The United States Senate confirmed the appointment on February 23, 1866.

After the war, he became a member of the Ohio Commandery of the Military Order of the Loyal Legion of the United States – a military society consisting of officers who had served the Union and their descendants.

Postbellum career
After the close of the war, Rice was manager of a private banking house in Ottawa, Ohio, was a delegate to the Democratic National Convention in 1872 and was elected a Democrat to the United States House of Representatives in 1874, serving from 1875 to 1879, not being a candidate for renomination in 1878. There, he served as chairman of the Committee on Invalid Pensions from 1877 to 1879. Afterward, he was president of A.V. Rice & Company, a banking concern in Ottawa, Ohio, was a director in various business enterprises and was appointed a pension agent for Ohio in 1893, serving from 1894 to 1898. Rice moved to Washington, D.C., in 1899 and engaged in banking and other various enterprises and was appointed a purchasing agent for the United States Census Bureau which he served as until his death in Washington, D.C. He was interred in Arlington National Cemetery in Arlington, Virginia.

Genealogy
Americus Vespucius Rice was a direct descendant of Edmund Rice, an English immigrant to Massachusetts Bay Colony, as follows:

Americus Vespucius Rice, son of
 Clark Hammond Rice (1804–1870), son of
 Ebenezer Rice (1773–1821), son of
 Samuel Rice (1752–1828), son of
 Gershom Rice (1703 – ?), son of
 Ephraim Rice (1665–1732), son of
 Thomas Rice (1626–1681), son of
 Edmund Rice (1594–1663)

See also

List of American Civil War generals (Union)

Footnotes

Notes

References
 Eicher, John H., and Eicher, David J., Civil War High Commands, Stanford University Press, 2001, .

External links
 Retrieved on 2008-08-15

Antioch College Alumni Page

1835 births
1904 deaths
American bankers
Union Army generals
Antioch College alumni
Union College (New York) alumni
People from Washington, D.C.
People of Ohio in the American Civil War
People from Perrysville, Ohio
Burials at Arlington National Cemetery
19th-century American politicians
People from Ottawa, Ohio
Democratic Party members of the United States House of Representatives from Ohio
19th-century American businesspeople